2019 WAFF U-18 Championship was the first edition of the WAFF U-18 Championship. A WAFF youth football championship organised by the West Asian Football Federation (WAFF) for the men's under-18 national teams of West Asia. It was held in Ramallah, Palestine from 22 August to 30 August 2019.

Format
The groups winner and the second-placed team of the two groups in the first round played in a single round-robin format, qualified for the semi-finals.

Participating nations
6 West Asian Federation teams entered the competition.

Officials

Referees
 Murad Al Zawahreh (Jordan) 
 Isa Abdulla Ali (Bahrain) 
 Yousif Saeed Hasan (Iraq) 
 Baraa Abu Aisha (Palestine) 
 Khaled Al-Shaqsi (Oman) 
 Abdullah Al-Kanderi (Kuwait) 
 Yaqoub Al-Hammadi (United Arab Emirates) 

Assistant Referees
 Hamza Abu Obied (Jordan) 
 Sayed Faisal Al Alawi (Bahrain) 
 Akram Jabbar (Iraq) 
 Farooq Assi (Palestine) 
 Abdulla Al-Jardani (Oman) 
 Ali Jaraq  (Kuwait)
 Masoud Hassan Fard (United Arab Emirates)

Group stage

Group A

Group B

Knockout stage

Bracket

Semi-finals

Fifth place

Third place

Final

Champion

References

External links 
 WAFF official website

WAFF U-18 Championship